The BAR 004 was the car with which the British American Racing Formula One team competed in the 2002 Formula One season. 

It was driven by the 1997 World Champion Jacques Villeneuve, and French racer Olivier Panis.

Season
The BAR 004 was launched on 18 December, 2001 at the teams headquarters in Brackley. The day after brand new team, Toyota.  The car featured dominant sponsorship from British American Tobacco brand, Lucky Strike, once again alongside Tiscali and Sonax.  The launch event also confirmed new team boss David Richards taking over from Craig Pollock, and his Prodrive business taking on management of the team.  The 004 was the first car designed solely in house by British American Racing technical director Malcolm Oastler following the end of a three year design agreement with Reynard.  Before the season began, engine supplier Honda confirmed a new contract to continue supplying engines to British American Racing until 2004.  This announcement at the cars launch also demonstrated the new Honda RA002E engine.   

At the first test in Barcelona in January, both Villeneuve and Panis tested the car alongside reserve driver Anthony Davidson.  All were outside the top 10 in their respective times.  By the time testing reached Valencia later in the month, Panis and Villeneuve finished 8th and 9th fastest respectively.

However the season itself was a dismal one.  It was not until the 2002 British Grand Prix that the team scored its first points of the season, a double points scoring round with Villeneuve in 4th and Panis in 5th.  The team would score just a further two points that season with Panis in 6th in Monza and Villeneuve in 6th at Indianapolis.  The team chalked up 17 retirements, including 5 races where both cars failed to finish.  Olivier Panis did not complete a Grand Prix until the 8th round of the season in Canada. Whilst some retirements were due to accidents, such as for Panis i Australia and Monte-Carlo, primarily the retirements were due to unreliability. In season testing at Valencia was completed by Panis and Davidson in an attempt to resolve some of the issues.

The BAR 004 would see the team finish 8th in the constructors championship with 7 points.

Drivers
Jacques Villeneuve and Olivier Panis were the race team drivers for the whole season.  Villeneuve was completing his fourth season with the team, meanwhile Panis his second.  The team had four reserve drivers who were Anthony Davidson, Darren Manning, Patrick Lemarie and Ryo Fukuda.  

Davidson was allowed to be temporarily released of duties for the team so he could race for Minardi whilst Alex Yoong took a two race break.

Complete Formula One results
(key)

References

BAR Formula One cars
2002 Formula One season cars